The Manipur Legislative Assembly  is the unicameral legislature of the Indian state of Manipur.

Members of the Manipur Legislative Assembly

Current parties in the Manipur Legislative Assembly

 
 
 
 
 
 
 

The following is the list of the members elected in the Manipur assembly:

See also
Vidhan Sabha
List of states of India by type of legislature

References

Manipur MLAs 2012–2017